This is a list of assets currently or formerly owned by the Walt Disney Company, unless otherwise indicated.

As of February 2023, Disney is organized into three main segments: Disney Entertainment which includes the company's film and TV assets as well as streaming; ESPN (including ESPN+); and Disney Parks, Experiences and Products.

Corporate

Disney Entertainment

Walt Disney Studios

Film studios

Walt Disney Studios Motion Pictures

Disney Theatrical Group

Disney Music Group

Disney Studio Services

Disney General Entertainment Content 

List of units based on current organizational structure:

A&E Networks 
50% equity holding; joint venture with Hearst Corporation

Disney Streaming

Disney Platform Distribution

International Network Brands

The Walt Disney Company Europe, Middle East and Africa 

The Walt Disney Company Europe, Middle East & Africa (doing business as The Walt Disney Company Limited) is the largest international division of the Walt Disney Company, serving the EMEA. It's headquarters' located at Queen Caroline Street, Hammersmith, West London, and have most of its locations, mostly in Europe.

The Walt Disney Company Latin America

The Walt Disney Company Asia Pacific

Disney Parks, Experiences and Products

Disney Consumer Products 

Disney Consumer Products, Inc. encompasses Disney Store, Disney Games, Disney Publishing, and Disney Licensing (including Disney Baby).

Disney retail

Disney games and interactive experiences

DCPI content

Disney Publishing Worldwide

Parks and resorts

Disneyland Resort

Walt Disney World Resort 
Lake Buena Vista, Florida, United States

Disney Parks International 
Disneyland International, oversees Disney's interest in Tokyo Disney Resort. The WDC has taken full ownership of Euro Disneyland, opened on April 12, 1992, as the Euro Disney Resort, located in Marne-la-Vallée, near Paris, France. Disney owns 48% of Hong Kong International Theme Parks, while the Government of Hong Kong owns 52% of the shares.

Disney Signature Experiences

Marvel Entertainment 

 Cover Concepts, Inc.
 Marvel Characters, Inc.
 Marvel New Media
 Marvel Entertainment International Limited (United Kingdom)
 Marvel Internet Productions LLC (Delaware)
 Marvel Property, Inc. (Delaware)
 Marvel International Character Holdings LLC (Delaware)
 MVL Development LLC (Delaware)
 MRV, Inc. (Delaware)
 Marvel Games
 Marvel Toys Limited (Hong Kong)
 MVL International C.V. (The Netherlands)
 Marvel Characters B.V. (The Netherlands)
 Marvel Worldwide, Inc.
 Marvel Comics
 Marvel Custom Solutions, customized comic books
 Marvel Press
 Marvel Unlimited
 Marvel Toys
 Marvel Universe
 Marvel Toys Limited (Hong Kong)

ESPN Inc. 

80% equity holding; 20% owned by Hearst Corporation

 ESPN
 ESPN2
 ESPN3
 ESPN+
 ESPN on ABC
 ESPN International
 ESPNews
 ESPN Deportes
 ESPN Films
 ESPN Classic
 ESPNU
 ESPN Now
 ESPN PPV
 ESPN Events
 ESPN Radio
 ESPN Books
 ESPN.com
 The Undefeated
 ESPN Home Entertainment
 ESPN Outdoors
 ESPN Digital Center
 ESPY Award
 ACC Network
 Longhorn Network
 SEC Network
 X Games
 DraftKings (minority investment)

Shared services
These are services shared between Disney Entertainment and ESPN segments
 Product and Technology
 Disney Platform Distribution
 Disney Advertising Sales
 Disney CreativeWorks
 Disney XP

Others 
 BVCC, Inc. (Buena Vista Construction Company) Disney World general contractor
 Disney Accelerator
 Disney Character Voices International
 Disney Institute, the professional development and external training arm
 Disney Programs
 Disney College Program
 Disney International Programs
 Disney Legends
 Golden Pass
 Disney University
 Disney Worldwide Outreach Program
 National Geographic Partners (73% majority holding; 27% owned by the National Geographic Society)
 Silver Creek Pictures, Inc.
 Sphero (June 2015) TWDC purchased a stake in the robotic toys company then approached them about building BB-8
Pixar RenderMan
Presto

Property holding companies 

 Carousel Holdings EAT LLC, Carousel Inn & Suites, Anaheim, California
 Axman Realty Corp.
 Boss Realty, Inc.
 Commercial Apartment Properties, Inc.
 The Celebration Co.
 Disney Keystone Properties, Inc.
 Disney Realty, Inc.
 Dutchman Realty, Inc.
 The Dolphin Hotel, Inc.
 Homestead Homes, Inc.
 The Little Lake Bryan Co.

 Maple Leaf Commercial Properties, Inc.
 The Swan Hotel, Inc.
 Walt Disney Properties Corp.

 Buena Vista Street, Burbank CA
 Pine Woods Properties, Inc.
 Holmes Houses, Inc.
 Key Bridge Properties, Inc.
 Florida properties
 Lake Bryan, Inc.
 Madeira Land Co., Inc.
 Magnolia Creek Development Co.

Financial 
 Arvida Disney Financial Services Inc.
 Arvida Real Estate Capital Inc., a commercial real estate investment banking subsidiary to arrange financing for commercial, industrial and retail projects

Venture capital 
Steamboat Ventures: ownership positions not revealed

 Baynote
 Chukong Technologies
 EdgeCast
 Elemental Technologies
 EMN8
 Fanzter, Inc.
 Fastclick
 FreeWheel
 GameSalad
 GoPro
 Greystripe

 Kapow Software
 MediaBank
 MerchantCircle
 Passenger
 Photobucket
 RazorGator
 Vobile
 VoodooVox
 Zettics

Chinese holdings 

 51Fanli
 Bokecc
 Cocoa China
 Gridsum Technology
 Netmovie

 Shangpin
 Troodon
 UUSee
 Yoyi Media
 YY

Unsorted 

 2139 Empire Avenue Corp.
 Alameda Payroll, Inc.
 Andes Productions, Inc.
 Animation Collectors, Inc.
 BVHV Services
 Before & After Productions, Inc.
 Berl Holding Co.
 Billy B. Productions, Inc.
 Blue Note Management Corp.
 Buena Vista Catalog Co.
 Buena Vista Laboratories, Inc.
 Buena Vista Trading Co.
 C.A. Productions, Inc.
 DCSR, Inc.
 Devonson Corp.
 Disney Art Editions, Inc.
 Disney Computer Magazine Group, Inc.
 Disney Credit Card Services, Inc.
 Disney Interfinance Corp.
 Disney Media Ventures, Inc.
 Disney Research
 Disney Special Programs, Inc.
 Disney, Inc.
 ERS Investment Ltd.
 Entertainment Development, Inc.
 Film Brothers Property Corp.
 From Time to Time Inc.
 Hardware Distribution, Inc.
 Heavy Weight, Inc.
 Hodi Investments, Inc.
 Hughes Flying Boat Corp.
 IJR, Inc.(inactive)
 Indian Warrior Productions, Inc.
 J.B. Productions, Inc.
 Kelly Management, Inc.
 LBV Services, Inc.
 Merriweather Productions, Inc. (inactive)
 Montrose Corp.
 One For All Productions, Inc.
 Palm Hospitality Co.

 Plymouth Productions
 PNLH Payroll Inc.
 RCE Services, Inc.
 Stakeout Two Productions, Inc.
 Supercomm International, Inc.
 Swing Kids Productions, Inc.
 The Inn Corp.
 The Quiz Show Co.
 Theme Park Productions, Inc.
 Toon Town, Inc.
 Voice Quality Coordination, Inc.
 WCO Leisure, Inc.
 WCO Parent Corp.
 WCO Port Management Corp.
 WCO Port Properties, Ltd.
 WCO Vacationland, Inc.
 WDT Services, Inc.
 WDW Services, Inc.
 Wanderlust Productions, Inc.

Partial assets 
 Inspector Gadget – Disney formerly owned the franchise as a whole during their limited partnership of DIC Entertainment from 1996 from 2000, before they sold DIC back to Andy Heyward. Disney also held international distribution to the original series outside North America through Jetix Europe after their acquisition of Fox Family Worldwide in 2001, before selling it, alongside 20 other DIC-owned programmes back to DIC in March 2006. Disney continues to hold the live-action film rights to the franchise through Walt Disney Pictures.
 Talking Friends – Franchise holder Outfit7 Entertainment signed an exclusive deal with Disney in 2012 that allowed the company to produce and distribute certain media for the franchise. Among the media created as part of the limited license included a web-series from Disney Interactive, two songs from Walt Disney Records, a Disney Create - Photo Mashup game that was available on disney.go.com/create, as well as a concert event featuring Radio Disney DJs to promote the Talking Friends Superstars toyline. The deal, however, did not include the original apps nor merchandise rights.

Former assets

Divested 
 ABC Radio Networks, a radio network, along with ABC's non-radio Disney and ESPN stations sold to Citadel Broadcasting with the network renamed as Citadel Media, and later sold to Cumulus Media and renamed as Cumulus Media Networks before being merged into Westwood One.
 Baby Einstein: Acquired by The Walt Disney Company in November 2001, sold to Kids II, Inc. in October 2013.
 Bass Anglers Sportsman Society
 Childcraft Education Corp., maker of children's furniture and equipment, retail stores and sold to U.S. Office Products Co. in 1997
 Childcraft, Inc.: catalog company
 DIC Entertainment - Acquired as part of CC/ABC purchase in November 1996, sold back to original owner in November 2000.
 E!: part owner
 Style Network
 Endemol Shine Group (50%) - acquired by Banijay
 FoxNext Games - sold to Scopely
 FoxNext Games LA studio
 Aftershock Studios
 Cold Iron Studios
 Fox Sports Networks - sold to Sinclair Broadcast Group and Entertainment Studios
 Arizona
 Detroit
 Florida/Sun
 Midwest (subfeeds: Indiana, Kansas City)
 North
 Ohio/SportsTime Ohio
 South / Fox Sports Southeast (subfeeds: Carolinas, Tennessee) 
 Southwest (subfeeds: Oklahoma, New Orleans)
 West/Prime Ticket (subfeed: San Diego)
 Wisconsin
 YES Network (80% equity) - sold to Sinclair Broadcast Group, Amazon and Yankee Global Enterprises
 Fusion Media Network, LLC, Fusion cable channel joint venture with Univision Communications, sold off the remaining 50% to Univision.
 GMTV: part owner; Sold to ITV plc and renamed ITV Breakfast Limited in 2009.
 Hyperion Books: sold to Hachette
 KCAL-TV: Sold to Young Broadcasting, now owned by CBS Television Stations.
 KRDC (AM)
 Miramax Films: Acquired by The Walt Disney Studios in 1993. Sold to Filmyard Holdings in 2010 and then beIN Media Group since 2016, co-owned with Paramount Global since 2019.
 Dimension Films: Retained by Bob and Harvey Weinstein and absorbed into The Weinstein Company when they left Miramax Films. Overseas rights, including the UK, to The Brothers Grimm were transferred from Miramax to Walt Disney Pictures outside the United States since 2015.
 MovieBeam
 Oxygen Media: part owner
 Power Rangers (BVS Entertainment) - Sold back to Haim Saban in 2010 alongside other shows related to it
 Radio Disney Group, sold off individual stations
 RTL Disney Fernsehen GmbH & Co KG (50/50 joint-venture with RTL Group) - Stake purchased out in March 2021
 Kividoo subscription video-on-demand (SVOD) service
 Scoyo
 Super RTL
 Toggolino Club
 Toggo Plus timeshift service
 Toggo Radio
 TrueX: Sold to Gimbal, Inc. in 2020.
 Walt Disney Studios Sony Pictures Releasing de México: Stake sold to Sony Pictures Releasing.
 Wondery (minority stake): Sold to Amazon Music in 2020.
 WJRT-TV, sold to Lily Broadcasting with WTVG
 WTVG
 TeleColombia: sold to Paramount Networks Americas in 2021.

Venture capital holdings sold 
 56.com: sold to Renren in September 2011
 Iridigm Display Corporation: acquired by Qualcomm, Inc., September 2004
 Kyte: acquired by KIT Digital, January 2011
 Move Networks: December 2010 acquisition of EchoStar
 PopularMedia: acquired by StrongMail, June 2009
 Pure Digital Technologies: acquired by Cisco in May 2009
 Quigo: acquired by AOL December 2007
 Rosum: sold to TruePosition in December 2010
 Scrapblog: sold to Mixbook December 2010
 Sometrics: acquired by American Express, September 2011
 Youxigu: Steamboat sold its stake to Tencent Holdings Ltd. in March 2010

Dormant or shuttered 
The following companies are subsidiaries of Disney that are either no longer active or have been absorbed into another part of the company.

 ABC Kids: Replaced by Litton's Weekend Adventure.
 Americast: Telephone digital TV joint venture
 Anaheim Sports, Inc.: Formerly Disney Sports Enterprises, Inc.
 Arena Football League: ESPN bought a minority share of the league in December 2006; the league ceased operations in July 2009. The AFL was revived in 2010, but is a separate legal entity from the original, with no Disney ownership.
 Avalanche Software: Closed in May 2016 and re-opened and acquired by Warner Bros. Interactive Entertainment in January 2017.
 Babble
 Black Rock Studio: formerly known as Climax Racing; acquired by Disney Interactive Studios (formerly Buena Vista Games) on September 28, 2006; closed on June 30, 2011.
 Blip Networks, Inc.: Acquired by Maker Studios (Now Disney Digital Network) in August 2013,. Shut down in August 2015.
 Blue Sky Studios - closed on April 10, 2021
 Bonnie View Productions, Ltd.: Production company for "Crusaders", a syndicated news magazine show
 Buena Vista Visual Effects
 BT Sport ESPN - License to use ESPN brand revoked, renamed BT Sport 4
 Cal Publishing: Cal Publishing was a subsidiary created by Disney to acquire the assets of CrossGen. After the acquisition, both companies were folded into Disney Publishing Worldwide. Disney subsidiary Marvel Comics has since tried to revive CrossGen as an imprint.
 Canasa Trading Corp.
 Caravan Pictures
 Disney Circle 7 Animation
 Club Penguin - Closed on March 30, 2017
 Club Penguin Island - Closed on December 20, 2018
 Club Disney: Creation of Disney Regional Entertainment, Club Disney had 5 locations built in the U.S. All 5 locations were closed in November 1999.
 Walt Disney Feature Animation Florida, Inc.
 Das Vierte
 Disney Auctions
 Disney Cinemagic
 Disney Comics 
 Disney Interactive Studios
 Disney Development Company: Construct arm
 Disney Regional Entertainment: Ran Disney Quest and the ESPN Zone Restaurant/entertainment chains. The division was closed in June 2010. Two ESPN Zones remain operating, but now as local franchises.
 DisneyLife, streaming service which offered some Disney branded content to subscriber's outside the US before Disney Plus.
 Disney TeleVentures, Inc.: Americast telco venture programming and technical support
 Disney Television and Telecommunications, division group (not to be confused with Walt Disney Television production division) eliminated after Disney-CC/ABC merger
 Disneytoon Studios
 Dream Quest Images: Merged with Disney Features Animation computer group to form The Secret Lab
 DreamWorks II Distribution Co. LLC, film rights acquired from DreamWorks and Reliance.
 DreamWorks Television (1994-2002): Joint venture of CC/ABC with DreamWorks which was dissolved at the end of the seven-year agreement
 Dlife - Closed in 2019
 ESPN Classic
 ESPN The Magazine
 Faded Denim Productions Ltd.: Defunct production company
 Fall Line Studios
 Fidelity Television, Inc.: owned KCAL-TV
 KHJ-TV, Inc.
 Fogbank Entertainment - shut downed in 2020
 Fox 2000 Pictures - dissolved on May 14, 2021
 Fox Consumer Products - folded into Disney Consumer Products in 2020
 Fox Life - Closed in 2022
 Fox Research Library
 Fox-Paramount Home Entertainment (A Nordic joint venture with Paramount Home Entertainment) - Closed in 2019
 Fox Pathé Europa (French joint venture with Pathé and EuropaCorp)
 Fox Sports International - assets either closed or dissolved into ESPN International
 Fox VFX Lab - Closed in 2019
 Fox Music - Merged with Hollywood Records in 2020
 FoxNext - Closed in 2020
 H2 - All international networks closed in 2022
 Harvest Groves, Inc.: Merged
 Hollywood Basic: Sub-label of Hollywood Records that released rap music (including music by DJ Shadow and Organized Konfusion). The label was discontinued in the mid-1990s.
 Hollywood Pictures: Film label of The Walt Disney Studios created in 1989 and shuttered in 2007.
 Hollywood Pictures Music: Label of Disney Music Publishing that distributed songs from Hollywood Pictures' titles.
 ImageMovers Digital: Closed in 2011 after the abysmal opening of Mars Needs Moms.
 Infoseek Corporation: Acquired by Disney in 1998 and merged into Disney's GO Network. The Infoseek name is no longer in use.
 Jumbo Pictures: Acquired by Disney in 1996, Jumbo Pictures produced Doug, 101 Dalmatians: The Series, and PB&J Otter for Disney. The company was folded into Walt Disney Television Animation.
 Jetix Europe, N.V., formerly Fox Kids Europe: 73% acquired with FOX/ABC Family Worldwide, Inc. & held by BVS International, N.V.; full owner in 2009, ran 13 Jetix channels
 GXT: Italian channel for older teens sold in the management buy out of Jetix Italy. Closed in late 2014
 K-2: Syndicated Italian block also sold in the management buy-out of Jetix Italy. 
 Jetix Consumer Products
 Jetix España S.L.: Joint venture with Sogecable S.A. to operate Jetix Spain
 Jetix Poland Limited: With minority owner, a subsidiary of United Pan-Europe Communications N.V.
 TV10 B.V.: Joint venture with SBS Broadcasting B.V. to services the Dutch channel
 Jetix Animation Concepts: Folded into Walt Disney Television Animation in 2009.
 Junction Point Studios
 Kingdom Comics: The Kingdom Comics unit's creatives/executives moved its deal to an independent Monsterfoot Production.
 Lake Buena Vista Communities, Inc.
 LAPTV
 Lyric Street Records: Record label specializing in country music
 Malibu Comics
 Mammoth Records: Independent record label acquired by Disney in 1997
 Marvel Animation (AKA Marvel Family Entertainment)
 Marvel Animation Studios: Part of Marvel Animation from 2012 until 2020
 MLG Productions 1 – MLG Productions 8: (Marvel's joint venture with Lionsgate) operationally defunct as the agreed-upon number of DTV movies were finished
 Pixar Canada: Opened in 2010, Closed in 2013.
 Playdom
 Propaganda Games: Shuttered in January 2011 after the development of Tron: Evolution was completed.
 Radio Disney Networks
 Radio Disney
 Radio Disney Country
 Radio Disney Junior
 Radio Disney Music Awards
 Ranch and Grove Holding Corp.: Merged
 Revelmode: Sub-network of Maker Studios (Now Disney Digital Network). Shut down after PewDiePie was dropped because of anti-semitic jokes made on his channel.
 The Secret Lab: Formed from Dream Quest Images & Walt Disney Features Animation computer group, closed in 2002
 SIP Animation (Saban International Paris): 49% Minority stake owned by Disney. Separated from BVS Entertainment in 2001, renamed in 2002 and eventually filed for liquidation and closed in 2009. 
 Skellington Productions, Inc.: Production company formed between Walt Disney Feature Animation and filmmakers Tim Burton and Henry Selick
 Soapnet: DATG cable channel that closed on December 31, 2013
 Sony ESPN (50%, joint-venture with Sony) - Closed in 2020
 Star Life - Closed on 31 March 2022
 Starwave: Starwave was merged with Infoseek and acquired by Disney in 1998 to form GO Network. Starwave no longer operates as a stand-alone business. The label was recently resurrected to form Disney's Starwave Mobile which licenses content from third-party companies for cell phone content.
 Star World - Closed in 2021
 Star World Premiere - Closed in 2021
 Star Premium - Closed on 1 February 2022
 Tapulous
 Togetherville: Acquired in February 2011. Discontinued in March 2012.
 Toontown Online: Servers were closed on September 19, 2013.
 Touchstone Pictures: it was inactive in 2016. The label still used in-home media distribution of catalog titles.
Touchstone Television: Folded into 20th Television in 2020.
 Touchwood Pacific Partner 1, Inc. (not the limited partnership itself)
 Toysmart.com: Controlling interest
 UTV Software Communications - Merged with Star India in 2020
 UTV Communications (USA) LLC
 UTV Motion Pictures - Closed in 2017
 UTV Action - Closed in 2021
 UTV Movies - Closed in 2021
 IG Interactive Entertainment Ltd.  - Closed in 2012
 UTV Global Broadcasting Ltd.
 UTV Games Ltd. - Closed in 2015
 UTV Indiagames - Closed in 2015
 UTV Toons
 Voyage - closed in 2020
 Walt Disney Television: transferred to ABC Television Network, and later folded into Touchstone Television (then ABC Studios, now known as ABC Signature)
 WatchESPN: Shut down on July 1, 2019.
 Wideload Games
 Wizzer Productions, Inc.: Production company for the 101 Dalmatians 1996 live action movie.
 YourTV - Closed in 2019

See also 
 Timeline of The Walt Disney Company
 List of Marvel Comics characters
 List of Star Wars characters
 List of acquisitions by Disney
 List of libraries owned by The Walt Disney Company
 Acquisition of 21st Century Fox by Disney

References 

Disney
Assets
The Walt Disney Company subsidiaries
Cable television companies of the United States